Walter Volle (18 September 1913 – 27 October 2002) was a German rower, coach, and crew member in the German boat in the coxed four competition, winning the gold medal in the 1936 Summer Olympics.

Volle was born in Mannheim, Germany, in 1913, and died in Berlin in 2002.

References

External links
 Database Olympics profile

1913 births
2002 deaths
Olympic rowers of Germany
Rowers at the 1936 Summer Olympics
Olympic gold medalists for Germany
Olympic medalists in rowing
German male rowers
Medalists at the 1936 Summer Olympics
European Rowing Championships medalists
Sportspeople from Mannheim